Linda Nolan (born 23 February 1959) is an Irish singer, actress and television personality. After moving with her family to Blackpool, at the age of three in 1962, she attained fame as a member of the girl group The Nolans in 1974, along with her sisters Anne, Denise, Maureen, Bernie and Coleen. As a member of the Nolans, she toured with Frank Sinatra in 1975, won the Tokyo Music Festival in 1981, and had seven UK top 20 hits between 1979 and 1982. 

Soon after leaving the group, she supported Gene Pitney on his 1984 UK tour. She then went on to perform in theatre, including an eight-season residency as Maggie May on Blackpool's Central Pier (1986–93), where she clocked up over 1,000 performances, followed by two seasons as Rosie O'Grady on Blackpool's South Pier (1994–95). She reunited with the Nolans for the 2009 I'm in the Mood Again album and tour, and in 2014, she took part in the 13th series of Celebrity Big Brother. In 2018, she was a recurring guest panellist on Loose Women.

Early life
Linda Nolan was born in Holles Street Hospital in Dublin, Ireland, to Tommy and Maureen Nolan. The family lived in Raheny, a suburb of Dublin. They lived there until she was three before moving to Blackpool in 1962, at which point Tommy and Maureen formed the Singing Nolans of which Nolan was a member. She went to school at Blackpool's St Catherine's Catholic Secondary School, and also attended The Cardinal Wiseman School in Greenford, West London.

Career

Singing career
In 1981, she scored a minor hit with her sister Coleen as part of the Young & Moody Band, with "Don't Do That" (UK No. 63) which also featured Lemmy from Motörhead and Cozy Powell.

She left The Nolans in December 1983 and quickly gained the label "Naughty Nolan" due to her posing in risqué publicity photos. The Nolans reunited as a five-piece (Bernie, Anne, Coleen, Maureen and Linda) for one-off performances of "I'm in the Mood for Dancing" first for BBC One's All Time Greatest Party Songs, hosted by Tess Daly, which aired on 17 December 2005 and again on 9 August 2007 on Loose Women.

Four of the sisters (Linda, Bernie, Coleen & Maureen) reunited in 2009 for a successful tour of the UK and Ireland. They also released an album I'm in the Mood Again, which reached No. 22 on the UK Album Chart.

Musicals
On leaving the group, Nolan went on to play the role of Maggie May at Blackpool's Central Pier for eight summer seasons (1986–93), clocking up more than 1,000 performances. She then starred for two seasons in a similar show on Blackpool's South Pier called Rosie O' Grady's (1994–95).

From 1996 to 1997, she starred as the prison governor in two UK tours of Prisoner: Cell Block H – The Musical, alongside Paul O'Grady.

From 2000, she starred as Mrs Johnstone in Blood Brothers for three years in the West End, and regularly played the role in the UK touring production until 2008. She was the third Nolan sister to play the role, after Bernie and Denise. Maureen Nolan has also since played the role in the West End on the UK tour for several years, earning the sisters a place in the Guinness World Records, as the most siblings to play the same role in a musical.

Other
Nolan has also appeared on Blankety Blank, with Anne and her daughter Alex on Celebrity Pressure Pad and with Bernie on Pointless Celebrities.

Celebrity Big Brother

In January 2014, Nolan participated in the thirteenth series of Celebrity Big Brother. Prior to this, her sister Coleen had participated in and achieved second place in the tenth series.

Upon learning that she was to be handcuffed, she confirmed her "Naughty Nolan" nickname by saying "I like a bit of bondage".

Jim Davidson, who was also a contestant in the house that year has history with Nolan; in 1995, Nolan's husband Brian Hudson was caught red-handed stealing money from comic Frank Carson's dressing room at the South Pier Theatre Blackpool. This raised the ire of Davidson, who was playing up the road at the time and promptly lost his temper, yelling "no one steals from my mates" and threatened to punch him. Davidson was promptly thrown out of that nightclub. On Day 15, Nolan was reminded by Davidson of his antics, prompting an argument. She was evicted on Day 22.

Personal life
Nolan met Brian Hudson in 1979 and they married in 1981. He was the Nolans' tour manager until 1983 and became his wife's manager after she left the group. They were married for 26 years until his death on 21 September  2007, from liver failure.

In 2006, Nolan was diagnosed with breast cancer. As part of her treatment, she underwent a single mastectomy. She was given the all-clear from cancer in 2011. In 2007, she was diagnosed with cellulitis and lymphedema in her arm.

In 2017, Nolan fell on her hip and was taken to hospital, where doctors discovered a form of incurable secondary breast cancer on her pelvis. She began undergoing regular radiotherapy treatment to make sure that the cancer would not spread, but has said that she would reject chemotherapy if the cancer was found to be terminal, after seeing how Bernie was in pain from her chemotherapy in 2013.

On 7 July 2014, she claimed that she was sexually assaulted by Rolf Harris in 1975 while The Nolans were supporting Harris in a tour of South Africa.

Filmography

Selected theatre

References

1959 births
Living people
Irish pop singers
Musicians from Dublin (city)
Irish emigrants to the United Kingdom
Irish women singers
Musicians from Blackpool